Facundo Talín (born 27 May 1985) is an Argentine footballer who plays Asd Città di Trani centre-back.

References

1985 births
Living people
Argentine footballers
Argentine expatriate footballers
Liga II players
Primera B Metropolitana players
Primera Nacional players
Liga 1 (Indonesia) players
SCM Râmnicu Vâlcea players
Nueva Chicago footballers
CS Pandurii Târgu Jiu players
Comisión de Actividades Infantiles footballers
Tiro Federal footballers
Club Atlético Patronato footballers
Club Atlético Platense footballers
CSyD Tristán Suárez footballers
Club Atlético San Miguel footballers
Club Blooming players
Club Almirante Brown footballers
PS TIRA players
Deportivo Español footballers
Deportivo Laferrere footballers
Association football defenders
Argentine expatriate sportspeople in Romania
Expatriate footballers in Romania
Argentine expatriate sportspeople in Indonesia
Expatriate footballers in Indonesia
Argentine expatriate sportspeople in Bolivia
Expatriate footballers in Bolivia
People from Ezeiza, Buenos Aires
Sportspeople from Buenos Aires Province